TeamBackpack is a music movement created in San Francisco by Armani Cooper, Dev Tejwani, and Nelson Silva. Since its early days, TeamBackpack has held cypher events in which underground & independent emcees rap a verse over originally produced beats, all in one take. With three to four people on a beat, these sessions are filmed live. Past cyphers featured artists such as Hopsin, Cyhi da Prynce, Joell Ortiz, Krizz Kaliko, Denzil Porter, Dizzy Wright and Rapsody.

On June 7, 2018, TeamBackPack, in conjunction with World Underground announced their inaugural World Underground Festival. The festival is scheduled for August 29 to 31, 2018.

Past Events/Collaborations 
 Rock The Bells, 2013 
 A3C, 2013 & 2014
 Hunger Pains Tour, 2014 
 Mission Underground LA (MULA), 2014 
 Mission Underground LA (MULA), 2015
 Mission Underground NY (MUNY), 2016

References

Internet properties established in 2010
Online music stores of the United States
Companies based in San Francisco